Dorans is a commune in the Territoire de Belfort department in Bourgogne-Franche-Comté in northeastern France.

Geography

Climate

Dorans has a oceanic climate (Köppen climate classification Cfb).

See also

Communes of the Territoire de Belfort department

References

Communes of the Territoire de Belfort